Sir Owen Frederick Morshead,  (28 September 1893 – 1 June 1977) was a British Army officer and librarian, who served as Royal Librarian from 1926 to 1958.

Early life
Morshead was born in Tavistock, Devon, the son of Reginald Morshead and Ella Mary Moreshead. He was educated at Marlborough College and then, initially intending to pursue a career in the Royal Engineers, at the Royal Military Academy, Woolwich. In 1913 he relinquished his cadetship and entered Magdalene College, Cambridge.

Career
Morshead's studies were interrupted by the outbreak of the First World War, in which he saw active service on the Western Front and Italian Front as a commissioned officer in the Royal Engineers. During the war he was awarded the Military Cross, invested as a Companion of the Distinguished Service Order, awarded the Italian War Merit Cross and was Mentioned in Despatches five times. He subsequently returned to Cambridge where he read Modern Languages. Upon graduating he became librarian of the Pepys Library.

In 1926 he became Royal Librarian at Windsor Castle and served in the position until 1958.  During the Second World War he commanded the 9th Battalion, Berkshire Home Guard and from 1946 to 1958 was a Deputy Lord Lieutenant of Berkshire. Morshead was appointed a Member of the Royal Victorian Order (MVO) in 1933, a Commander (CVO) in 1937, a Knight Commander (KCVO) in 1944, and a Knight Grand Cross (GCVO) upon his retirement in 1958. He was made a Knight Commander of the Order of the Bath (KCB) in 1953. George VI sent Morshead, accompanied by Anthony Blunt, then working part-time in the Royal Library as well as for British intelligence, to Friedrichshof in March 1945 to secure papers relating to the German Empress Victoria, the eldest child of Queen Victoria. Looters had stolen part of the castle's archive, including surviving letters between daughter and mother, as well as other valuables, some of which were recovered in Chicago after the war. The papers rescued by Morshead and Blunt, and those returned by the American authorities from Chicago, were deposited in the Royal Archives. From 1958 to 1971 he was given the honorary title of Emeritus Librarian by Elizabeth II.

Personal life
Morshead married Paquita, daughter J.G. Hagemeyer, of Florence, Italy in 1926. They had one son and two daughters. Morshead was the founder and chairman of the Dorset Historic Churches Trust. He was a close personal friend of George V and Queen Mary.

References

1893 births
1977 deaths
Alumni of Magdalene College, Cambridge
British Army personnel of World War I
Companions of the Distinguished Service Order
Knights Commander of the Order of the Bath
Knights Grand Cross of the Royal Victorian Order
People educated at Marlborough College
Recipients of the Military Cross
Royal Engineers officers
Royal Librarians